EyeSteelFilm is a Montreal-based Canadian cinema production company co-founded by Daniel Cross and Mila Aung-Thwin, dedicated to socially engaged cinema, bringing social and political change through cinematic expression. Today the studio is run by Co-Presidents Mila Aung-Thwin and Bob Moore.

Notable collective members

Daniel Cross - producer and director
Mila Aung-Thwin - producer and director
Bob Moore - producer

Directors (past and present)
Laura Bari - director
Yung Chang - director
Karina Garcia Casanova - director
Eric "Roach" Denis - director
Mia Donovan - director
Lixin Fan - director
Omar Majeed - director
Peter Wintonick - director
Ryan Mullins - director

Films
Full feature documentary films

Short films

Films presently in progress include:
Rainforest: The Limit of Spleandor (by Richard Boyce), Inkulal (by Linda Vastrik), Inventing the Future (by Daniel Cross), Jingle Bell Rocks! (by Mitchell Kezin), Just A Click Away (by Laura Turek), Les Tickets (by Eric "Roach" Denis), Such Great Heights (by Richard Boyce), Turcot (by Daniel Cross)

Recognition
EyeSteelFilm has received numerous awards from international film festivals and annual television and film awards. EyeSteelFilm has collaborated with international broadcasters including Super Channel, PBS, CBC, National Geographic Channel, The History Channel, BBC, YLE, TV2 Denmark, ZDF ARTE, The Documentary Channel, SBS, etc. They have received support from the Canada Council for the Arts, SODEC, CALQ, and National Film Board of Canada.

EyeSteelFilm is a RealScreen magazine Global 100 Company.
Montreal Mirror arts weekly chose the firm as one of the "Noisemaker"s of 2007.
EyeSteelFilm founder and president was one of five MIPDOC Trailblazers of 2008.

References

External links
EyeSteelFilm official website
EyeSteelFilm Facebook area
EyeSteelFilm blip.tv channel
EyeSteelFilm imdb page

 
Film production companies of Canada
Companies based in Montreal
Documentary film production companies
Companies with year of establishment missing
Quebec Anglophone culture in Montreal